Bianca Silva (born 22 July 1998) is a Brazilian rugby sevens player. She competed in the women's tournament at the 2020 Summer Olympics. She represented Brazil at the 2022 Rugby World Cup Sevens in Cape Town, they placed eleventh overall.

References

External links
 

1998 births
Living people
Female rugby sevens players
Olympic rugby sevens players of Brazil
Rugby sevens players at the 2020 Summer Olympics
Place of birth missing (living people)
Brazilian female rugby union players
Brazil international women's rugby sevens players
Brazilian rugby sevens players